Arthur Hranti Minasyan (born 4 June 1977) is an Armenian former footballer and current manager who played as a midfielder and made five appearances for the Armenia national team. He played the majority of his career at Ararat Yerevan between 1998 and 2013, only leaving for two short stints with teams in Iran and Poland.

Career
Minasyan made his international debut for Armenia on 11 October 2006 in a UEFA Euro 2008 qualifying match against Serbia, which finished as a 0–3 away loss. He made five appearances in total for Armenia, earning his final cap on 1 June 2008 in a friendly match against Greece, which finished as a 0–0 draw.

Career statistics

International

References

External links
 
 
 
 
 

1977 births
Living people
Footballers from Yerevan
Armenian footballers
Armenian expatriate footballers
Armenian expatriate sportspeople in Iran
Expatriate footballers in Iran
Armenian expatriate sportspeople in Poland
Expatriate footballers in Poland
Armenia international footballers
Association football midfielders
FC Ararat Yerevan players
F.C. Ararat Tehran players
Resovia (football) players
Armenian Premier League players
Armenian First League players
II liga players
Armenian football managers
FC Ararat Yerevan managers